Charles DeChant (born June 10, 1945) is an American saxophone and keyboard player known for his association with Hall & Oates.

Career
Born in Florida on June 10, 1945, DeChant has been playing in the band since 1976. Notable saxophone solos are heard in the Hall & Oates songs "One on One", "Maneater," the extended version of "Say It Isn't So," and "I Can't Go for That (No Can Do)." DeChant also plays with several local bands in his home town, Orlando, Florida. He also plays flute, piano, and guitar.

Besides recording and touring with Hall & Oates, DeChant has played with other stars including Mick Jagger, The Temptations, Tina Turner, Billy Joel, Bonnie Raitt, and The Average White Band. DeChant toured with Hall & Oates throughout the 2010s and has been a sometime member of Daryl Hall's band for Live from Daryl's House. DeChant is now also a writer, producer and solo artist and also offers an online saxophone course.

References

External links
"Mr Casual" Charlie DeChant (Official Site)
Daryl Hall & John Oates talk about 'Mr Casual' Charlie DeChant
"Maneater" video
"I Can't Go for That (No Can Do)" video

American male saxophonists
Living people
Musicians from Orlando, Florida
Hall & Oates members
21st-century American saxophonists
21st-century American male musicians
1945 births
Daryl Hall and the Daryl's House Band members